Steve Passmore (born January 29, 1973 in Thunder Bay, Ontario) is a Canadian former professional ice hockey goaltender. He was drafted by the Quebec Nordiques as their ninth-round pick in the 1992 NHL Entry Draft. He played 93 games in the NHL between 1998 and 2004 with the Edmonton Oilers, Chicago Blackhawks, and Los Angeles Kings. The rest of his career, which lasted from 1994 to 2007, was spent in the minor leagues and in Europe.

Playing career
As a member of the Victoria Cougars in the 1991–92 season, Passmore set Western Hockey League single season records for most games by a goaltender (71), minutes played (4,228) and most saves (2,562).

After finishing his major junior career with the Kamloops Blazers, Passmore was traded by the Nordiques on March 21, 1994 to the Edmonton Oilers in exchange for Brad Werenka. In his second season within the Oilers organization, Passmore was limited to just two games with affiliate, the Cape Breton Oilers after he was diagnosed with a career threatening case of heavy metal poisoning.

Upon recovery, Passmore spent most of his career in the AHL and as a backup goaltender in the NHL. He was nominated for the NHL's Masterton Trophy by the Chicago Blackhawks in 2000 for his return to from his blood disease.

During the 2004–05 NHL lockout he played for Adler Mannheim in the Deutsche Eishockey Liga, and in November 2005 he signed with Jokerit in the Finnish SM-liiga to replace Karl Goehring, but Passmore was also a disappointment, and was eventually replaced by Tom Askey. After a short stint with Austrian club. Graz 99ers in January 2007 he was signed by HCJ Milano Vipers of the Italian Serie A where he would end his professional career.

Passmore now lives in Kamloops, British Columbia.

Career statistics

Regular season and playoffs

Awards
 WHL West First All-Star Team – 1993 & 1994

References

External links

1973 births
Living people
Adler Mannheim players
Canadian expatriate ice hockey players in Austria
Canadian expatriate ice hockey players in Italy
Canadian expatriate ice hockey players in Finland
Canadian expatriate ice hockey players in Germany
Canadian ice hockey goaltenders
Cape Breton Oilers players
Chicago Blackhawks players
Chicago Wolves (IHL) players
Cleveland Lumberjacks players
Edmonton Oilers players
Graz 99ers players
Hamilton Bulldogs (AHL) players
HC Milano players
Ice hockey people from Ontario
Jokerit players
Kamloops Blazers players
Los Angeles Kings players
Lowell Lock Monsters players
Merritt Centennials players
Norfolk Admirals players
Quebec Nordiques draft picks
Raleigh IceCaps players
San Antonio Rampage players
Sportspeople from Thunder Bay
Tri-City Americans players
Victoria Cougars (WHL) players